Bonitus was a Salian Frank of Laetic origin. He was the first ever Frank to be made magister militum, in 324. He fought beside Constantine against Licinius and was the father of the general Claudius Silvanus.

Sources
 Ammianus Marcellinus, History, XV,5,33

Frankish warriors
Magistri militum
4th-century Frankish people
Year of birth unknown